The Western Military Command is one of eight Military Commands of the Brazilian Army. The Western Military Command or "Comando Militar do Oeste" (CMO) is responsible for the defence of the states Mato Grosso and Mato Grosso do Sul.

Current Structure 

 Western Military Command (Comando Militar do Oeste e 9ª Divisão de Exército) - Campo Grande
 HQ Company Western Military Command (Companhia de Comando do Comando Militar do Oeste) in Campo Grande
 3rd Army Aviation Battalion (3º Batalhão de Aviação do Exército) in Campo Grande
 6th Military Intelligence Battalion (6º Batalhão de Inteligência) in Campo Grande
 9th Signals Battalion (9º Batalhão de Comunicações) in Campo Grande
 14th Military Police Company (14ª Companhia de Polícia do Exército) in Campo Grande
 9th Military Region (9ª Região Militar) in Campo Grande
 HQ Company 9th Military Region (Companhia de Comando da 9ª Região Militar) in Campo Grande
 9th Guard Company (9ª Companhia de Guardas) in Campo Grande
 Campo Grande Military Area Hospital (Hospital Militar de Área de Campo Grande) in Campo Grande
 30th Military Service Circumscription (30ª Circunscrição de Serviço Militar) in Campo Grande
 9th Logistics Group (9º Grupamento Logístico) in Campo Grande
 HQ Company 9th Logistics Group (Companhia de Comando do 9º Grupamento Logístico) in Campo Grande
 9th Supply Battalion (9º Batalhão de Suprimento) in Campo Grande
 9th Transport Battalion (9º Batalhão de Transporte) in Campo Grande
 9th Maintenance Battalion (9º Batalhão de Manutenção) in Campo Grande
 9th (Reserve) Medical Battalion (9º Batalhão de Saúde) in Campo Grande
 4th Mechanized Cavalry Brigade (4ª Brigada de Cavalaria Mecanizada) in Dourados
 HQ Squadron 4th Mechanized Cavalry Brigade (Esquadrão de Comando da 4ª Brigada de Cavalaria Mecanizada) in Dourados
 10th Mechanized Cavalry Regiment (10º Regimento de Cavalaria Mecanizado) in Bela Vista
 11th Mechanized Cavalry Regiment (11º Regimento de Cavalaria Mecanizado) in Ponta Porã
 17th Mechanized Cavalry Regiment (17º Regimento de Cavalaria Mecanizado) in Amambaí
 20th Armored Cavalry Regiment (20º Regimento de Cavalaria Blindado) in Campo Grande
 9th Field Artillery Group (9º Grupo de Artilharia de Campanha) in Nioaque
 28th Logistics Battalion (28º Batalhão Logístico) in Dourados
 3rd Anti-air Artillery Battery (3ª Bateria de Artilharia Antiaérea) in Lagoas
 4th Mechanized Combat Engineer Company (4ª Companhia de Engenharia de Combate Mecanizada) in Jardim
 14th Mechanized Signals Company (14ª Companhia de Comunicações Mecanizada) in Dourados
 4th Military Police Platoon (4º Pelotão de Polícia do Exército) in Dourados
 13th Motorized Infantry Brigade (13ª Brigada de Infantaria Motorizada) in Cuiabá
 HQ Company 13th Motorized Infantry Brigade (Companhia de Comando da 13ª Brigada de Infantaria Motorizada) in Cuiabá
 2nd Frontier Battalion (2º Batalhão de Fronteira) in Cáceres
 17th Frontier Battalion (17º Batalhão de Fronteira) in Corumbá
 44th Motorized Infantry Battalion (44º Batalhão de Infantaria Motorizado) in Cuiabá
 47th Infantry Battalion (47º Batalhão de Infantaria) in Coxim
 58th Infantry Battalion (58º Batalhão de Infantaria) in Aragarças
 18th Field Artillery Group (18º Grupo de Artilharia de Campanha) in Rondonópolis
 2nd Frontier Company (2ª Companhia de Fronteira) in Porto Murtinho
 13th Military Police Platoon (13º Pelotão de Polícia do Exército) in Cuiabá
 3rd Engineer Group (3º Grupamento de Engenharia) in Campo Grande
 HQ Company 3rd Engineer Group (Companhia de Comando do 3º Grupamento de Engenharia) in Campo Grande
 2nd Combat Engineer Battalion (2º Batalhão de Engenharia de Combate) in Pindamonhangaba
 9th Combat Engineer Battalion (9º Batalhão de Engenharia de Combate) in Aquidauana
 9th Construction Engineer Battalion (9º Batalhão de Engenharia de Construção) in Cuiabá
 11th Construction Engineer Battalion (11º Batalhão de Engenharia de Construção) in Araguari

References

Commands of the Brazilian Armed Forces
Regional commands of the Brazilian Army